Jyotsna Patel (also Jyotsana Patel) is a former Test cricketer who represented India. She was born in Indore, Madhya Pradesh and played two Test matches for India.

References

Living people
Indian women cricketers
Cricketers from Indore
India women Test cricketers
Madhya Pradesh women cricketers
Sportswomen from Madhya Pradesh
20th-century Indian women
20th-century Indian people
Year of birth missing (living people)